Ismet Hadžić "Hadžija" (7 July 1954 – 14 July 2015) was a Bosnian-Herzegovinian professional footballer who played as a defender for FK Sloboda Tuzla, GNK Dinamo Zagreb, FC Prishtina and the Yugoslav national team. He was also a coach in the GNK Dinamo Zagreb Academy.

Club career
He was part of the Dinamo Zagreb squad that won the 1981–82 Yugoslav First League and the 1982–83 Yugoslav Cup.

International career
He made his debut for Yugoslavia in an April 1979 European Championship qualification match away against Cyprus and has earned a total of 5 caps, scoring no goals. His final international was an April 1983 friendly match against France.

Personal life

Death
Hadžić died at the age of 61 on 14 July 2015 in Zagreb, Croatia. He was buried in his hometown of Tuzla, Bosnia and Herzegovina on 16 July 2015.

Honours

Player

Club
Dinamo Zagreb
Yugoslav First League: 1981–82
Yugoslav Cup: 1982–83

International
Yugoslavia
Mediterranean Games: 1979

References

External links

EX-YU Fotball Statistics by years

1954 births
2015 deaths
Sportspeople from Tuzla
Association football defenders
Bosnia and Herzegovina footballers
Yugoslav footballers
Yugoslavia international footballers
Mediterranean Games gold medalists for Yugoslavia
Competitors at the 1979 Mediterranean Games
Mediterranean Games medalists in football
FK Sloboda Tuzla players
GNK Dinamo Zagreb players
FC Prishtina players
Yugoslav First League players